Clive Anderson's Chat Room is a radio programme that started in October 2004 and series seven was aired in Autumn 2009. Hosted by Clive Anderson, it is broadcast on BBC Radio 2 and produced by Above the Title Productions.

Each week the panel of guests include a mix of comedians, critics, commentators and politicians who discuss some of the week's news stories. The audience also get the chance to ask questions to the guests.

Episode and guest list

References
 Lavalie, John. "Clive Anderson's Chat Room." EpGuides. 21 Jul 2005. 29 Jul 2005  <http://epguides.com/CliveAndersonschatroom/>.

External links
 

BBC Radio 2 programmes
2004 radio programme debuts